Yek Dangeh (also Romanized as Yek Dāngeh) is a village in Hamaijan Rural District, Hamaijan District, Sepidan County, Fars Province, Iran. At the 2006 census, its population was 254, in 56 families.

References 

Populated places in Sepidan County